David Lyons (born 15 June 1980) is a rugby union player for Stade Français. He plays Number Eight and has also played for the Wallabies.

Playing career
Lyons was born in Orange, New South Wales. From his debut in 2000 he played 83 consecutive games for the Waratahs, a record for an Australia player. In 2004 Lyons was awarded the John Eales medal as Wallabies player of the year.

Lyons signed a 4-year contract with Welsh team the Scarlets for the 2008–09 Magners League season, debuting against Bath Rugby in August 2008. In his first season, he remarkably started in all 30 of the Scarlets' league and cup matches. In July 2009 Lyons became vice-captain of the Scarlets for the 2009–10 Magners League season. He had previously captained the side in two matches at the end of the 2008–09 season However, due to an injury to regular skipper Mark Jones, he led the side for most of the season and eventually took over the captain's armband for the 2010–11 Magners League season.
On 15 June 2011, Lyons was released by the Scarlets at the end of his third season with the club. The next day, he signed a contract with Stade Français.

Lyons played for the Barbarians against the Wallabies at the Sydney Football Stadium in June 2009.

References

 

1980 births
Living people
Australian rugby union players
Australia international rugby union players
New South Wales Waratahs players
Scarlets players
Rugby union number eights
People from Orange, New South Wales
Rugby union players from New South Wales